The Party Ain't Over Yet... is the twenty-seventh album by English rock band Status Quo, released 19 September 2005.

Track listing 

 "The Party Ain't Over Yet" (John David) 3:50
 "Gotta Get Up and Go" (Francis Rossi, Bob Young) 4:18
 "All That Counts Is Love" (John David) 3:41
 "Familiar Blues" (Rick Parfitt, Andy Bown) 5:09
 "The Bubble" (Andy Bown, John Edwards) 5:36
 "Belavista Man" (Rick Parfitt, John Edwards) 4:21
 "Nevashooda" (Andy Bown, Matt Letley) 3:52
 "Velvet Train" (John Edwards, Andy Bown) 3:33
 "Goodbye Baby" (Francis Rossi, Bob Young) 4:08
 "You Never Stop" (Francis Rossi, Rick Parfitt, Andy Bown, John Edwards, Matt Letley) 4:33
 "Kick Me When I'm Down" (John David, Webb Wilder) 3:17
 "Cupid Stupid" (Francis Rossi, Bob Young) 3:51
 "This Is Me" (Rick Parfitt, John Edwards) 4:47

Australia Tour Edition bonus disc
 "The Party Ain't Over Yet" [single mix] (John David) 3:52
 "Belavista Man" [live at Emden] (Rick Parfitt, John Edwards) 4:27
 "I Ain't Ready" (Francis Rossi, Bob Young) 4:34
 "I'm Watching over You" (Francis Rossi, Bob Young) 3:49
 "Gerdundula" [live at Liverpool Pops] (Francis Rossi, Bob Young) 6:45
 "Mystery Medley" [live at Liverpool Pops] 10:05
 "Mystery Song" (Rick Parfitt, Bob Young)
 "Railroad" (Francis Rossi, Bob Young) 
 "Most Of The Time" (Francis Rossi, Bob Young) 
 "Wild Side Of Life" (William Warren, Arlie A. Carter) 
 "Rollin' Home" (Alan Lancaster, Francis Rossi) 
 "Again And Again" (Rick Parfitt, Andy Bown, Jackie Lynton) 
 "Slow Train" (Francis Rossi, Bob Young)
 The Party Ain't Over Yet [promo video] (John David) 4:20
 The Party Ain't Over Yet [photo gallery] (John David)

Personnel
Francis Rossi - Vocals & lead guitar
Rick Parfitt - Vocals & guitar
John Edwards - Bass
Andy Bown - Keyboards
Matt Letley - Drums
Recorded at Jacobs Studios

Charts

References

Status Quo (band) albums
2005 albums
Albums produced by Mike Paxman